The Employment Protection Act 1975 (c 71) (EPA 1975) was an Act of the Parliament of the United Kingdom. The long title was,

Outline
Together with the Trade Union and Labour Relations Act 1974, these Acts constituted the Labour Party's employment law programme during the era of the Social Contract, and the EPA established the employment tribunal system as a separate entity from the previous, formal court system. The Act also established the Advisory, Conciliation and Arbitration Service (ACAS) as a statutory body.

United Kingdom Acts of Parliament 1975
1975 in labor relations

United Kingdom labour law
Trade union legislation